The 1895 All-Ireland Senior Football Championship Final was the eighth All-Ireland Final and the deciding match of the 1895 All-Ireland Senior Football Championship, an inter-county Gaelic football tournament for the top teams in Ireland. 

As counties were represented in that era by their champion clubs, Tipperary was represented by Arravale Rovers while Pierce O'Mahony's club from Navan played for Meath. Tipp won, with all four of its points scored by Willie Ryan. The referee later admitted that he should have not awarded one of Tipperary's points, but Meath sportingly did not ask for a replay.

It was Tipperary's second All-Ireland football title following success in 1889.

References

Final
All-Ireland Senior Football Championship Finals
Meath county football team matches
Tipperary county football team matches